Foreign Exchange is a 2008 American independent film directed by Danny Roth.

Plot
Four high school friends decide to take all easy classes their last year of high school. One of their classes is a program for housing foreign exchange students. The four students are having troubles with grades, aspirations and love and are helped out by the foreign exchange students that they were supposed to be helping out.

Cast
 Ryan Pinkston ..... Dave
 Vanessa Lengies ..... Robyn
 Randy Wayne ..... Jay Noble
 Tania Raymonde ..... Anita Duarte
 Daniel Booko ..... Gordon "Shantz" Lally
 Aaron Hill ..... Christopher Hunter
 Jennifer Coolidge ..... Principal Lonnatini
 Ashley Edner ..... Jez
 Jessika Van ..... Mia Ho
 Curtis Armstrong ..... Marvin
 Clint Howard ..... Long Larry

Production
The film was shot in Los Angeles, California.

External links
 

2008 films
American independent films
American high school films
2000s teen sex comedy films
Student exchange in fiction
2008 comedy films
2000s English-language films
2000s American films